Mel Arnold  (born 1958) is a Canadian politician who was elected as a Member of Parliament in the House of Commons of Canada to represent the federal electoral district of North Okanagan—Shuswap during the 2015 Canadian federal election.

Arnold was active on the boards of local service clubs, including the BC Wildlife Federation and Canadian Wildlife Federation, where he held the role of President for two terms. Before serving as a member of Parliament, he served on his Salmon Arm's environmental advisory council for eight years. In 2010 was appointed to the B.C. government's Species at Risk Task Force.

Politics 
Arnold voted in support of Bill C-233 - An Act to amend the Criminal Code (sex-selective abortion), which would make it an indictable or a summary offence for a medical practitioner to knowingly perform an abortion solely on the grounds of the child's genetic sex.

Electoral record

References

Living people
Conservative Party of Canada MPs
Members of the House of Commons of Canada from British Columbia
1958 births
Canadian conservationists
People from Salmon Arm
21st-century Canadian politicians